Hoogstade is a village in the municipality of Alveringem in the Belgian province of West Flanders. The village is located on the N8. Until 1971, Hoogstade was an independent municipality.

Overview 
Hoogstade was first mentioned in 859 als Hostede. In 1578, the first armed meeting of Protestants in Veurne-Ambacht took place in Colaertshille near Hoogstade. In 1794, the village was destroyed by French troops.

Hoogstade was spared during World War I. In 1871 Clep, a retirement home, had been built in the village. On 29 January 1915, it was decided to turn the retirement home into a hospital, because it was close to the Yser Front, yet at a safe distance from the artillery bombardments. The Belgian Field Hospital was very important during the Second Battle of Ypres. It had a capacity of 200 beds. Nevertheless 1,320 soldiers died in the hospital. As of 2014, Clep is in use as a homeless shelter.

The Hoogstade Belgian Military Cemetery is located near Hoogstade. Originally it also contained 150 French and some German graves. Nowadays, it is the resting ground for 805 Belgian, and 20 British soldiers. 17 Belgian soldiers are unidentified.

In 1971, the municipality was merged into Alveringem.

References 

Alveringem
Populated places in West Flanders